The 2014 Connecticut Senate election was held on November 4, 2014, concurrently with the elections for the Connecticut House of Representatives, to elect members to the Connecticut General Assembly. All 36 seats in the Connecticut Senate were up for election. Republicans gained one seat from the Democrats.

Results

District 1

District 2

District 3

District 4

District 5

District 6

District 7

District 8

District 9

District 10

District 11

District 12

District 13

District 14

District 15

District 16

District 17

District 18

District 19

District 20

District 21

District 22

District 23

District 24

District 25

District 26

District 27

District 28

District 29

District 30

District 31

District 32

District 33

District 34

District 35

District 36

References

2014 Connecticut elections
C
Connecticut State Senate elections